The Legacy is a 1978 horror film directed by Richard Marquand, in his directorial debut, and starring Katharine Ross, Sam Elliott, Roger Daltrey, John Standing, and Margaret Tyzack. It follows an American couple who are summoned to a British mansion while visiting England for a work obligation, where they stumble upon its family's curse.

A co-production between the United Kingdom and the United States, The Legacy was released in the United Kingdom in September 1978, and one year later in the United States.

Plot

Plot summary 
Maggie Walsh and her boyfriend Pete Danner are interior decorators from Los Angeles. Maggie receives a large financial retainer from an anonymous client in Britain for an unspecified piece of work. They are reluctant to abandon their current client in California, but are released when that client dies suddenly under mysterious circumstances. Using their pre-paid airfare, they travel to England; soon after, they are involved in a traffic collision with a chauffeur-driven Rolls-Royce. The passenger and owner, Jason Mountolive, invites them to his rambling country estate, Ravenhurst, where they are greeted by Nurse Adams.

They find that Mountolive has also invited the five potential heirs to his financial estate, all public figures with notorious reputations.  The other guests explain that they have been summoned because Jason is dying, "wasting away" above the stairs.  Maggie is astonished to hear this because Jason seemed vigorous just minutes earlier.

Shortly afterward one of the guests, Maria Gabrieli, despite being an excellent swimmer, becomes trapped under the surface of Jason's indoor pool and drowns.

Mountolive receives his guests in his bedroom, a sterile chrome and glass environment where he lies connected to a life support system. His bed is shrouded by white curtains that obscure his appearance. He calls Maggie to the bedside, where a monstrous hand reaches out of the curtains and places a signet ring on her finger with the Mountolive family crest upon it. The other guests already wear identical rings. Maggie tries to remove the ring, but it cannot be taken from her finger. Maggie and Pete find they are unable to leave the Ravenhurst grounds.

The other guests begin to die by mysterious and gruesome means. Clive Jackson gets a chicken bone lodged in his throat during dinner (although he was not eating chicken at the time) and perishes during a botched tracheotomy. Karl Liebnecht is incinerated by a massive burst of flame from a fireplace that leaves the rest of the room untouched. A mirror in Barbara Kirstenburg's bedroom explodes, piercing her with glass shards, then restores itself without a crack. Jacques Grandier suspects Maggie and Pete of engineering these inexplicable deaths, and makes his way onto the roof with a shotgun. After taking a few shots at Pete, the weapon jams and explodes in his face, knocking him off the roof to his death.

Maggie and Pete find a collection of newspaper clippings. These reveal that each of their fellow guests had been accused of serious crimes or implicated in major scandals, yet always escaped punishment or censure thanks to Mountolive's intervention. Mountolive's ancestors were Lady Margaret Walsingham (whose portrait Maggie closely resembles) and the Lord of Mountolive; both families included notorious practitioners of black magic and witchcraft. Lady Margaret and her husband were burned at the stake for heresy. Maggie realises that she is Jason's great-granddaughter, and that the retainer was a ruse to lure her to Ravenhurst before Mountolive dies so he could appoint her as his sixth potential heir.

As the last remaining heir to Mountolive's legacy, Maggie stands to inherit the vast Walsingham-Mountolive financial empire. She confronts Mountolive. With his last breath, he confesses that he sacrificed the other heirs to the Devil in order to pass on his sinister powers to her. He instructs her to choose six heirs of her own, who will likewise be sacrificed when the time comes so that the lone survivor will also inherit the powers bestowed by Satan.

Pete forces his way into the room and tries to prevent the transfer of power by sabotaging Mountolive's life-support system. He is too late; Maggie has accepted her legacy and is now "Lady Margaret". The household staff declares their allegiance to her. Maggie selects Pete as her first beneficiary. She gives him a signet ring which immediately attaches itself to his finger.

Themes 
Themes presented in the film include karma, and reincarnation.

Cast

Production and development

Screenplay 
Jimmy Sangster originally wrote a supernatural script set in a run-down hospital in downtown Detroit. Much to his dismay, the script was altered to more closely resemble other Hammer movies. Although keeping the American protagonists, events were manipulated to allow the story instead to take place in an English country estate featuring a collection of stereotypical butlers, chauffeurs and curtseying maids.

Alternative titles 
The Devil’s Doorway (Working),
Psychose (Alternative),
The Legacy of Maggie Walsh (Alternative)

Casting 
Considered for Karl were Harry Andrews, Peter Cushing, Bernard Archard, Herbert Lom, Donald Pleasence, Christopher Lee, Michael Gough, Anton Diffring, Peter Arne, Patrick Troughton, Peter Vaughn and Donald Houston.

Considered for Grandier were Peter Arne, Frank Finlay, Peter Jeffrey, Joss Ackland, Ian Bannen, John Carson and Ian Hendry.

Locations and dates 
Principal photography began on 16 January 1978 at Bray Studios in Berkshire, England, concluding on 23 March 1978.

Opening Montage, Shopping - 163 Gloucester Rd, London, UK

Opening Montage, Underground - Regent Street, London, UK

Opening Montage, Sunset - Hyde Park, London, UK

Riding Round the Country #1 - Dolesden Lane, Turville, UK

Riding Round the Country #2 - Skirmett Road, Hambleden, UK

Church #1 - St Mary the Virgin Church, Holloway Lane, Turville, UK

Church #2 - St Bartholomew Church, Chequers Lane, Henley-on-Thames, UK

Wade's Garage - Pheasant's Hill Frieth, Hambleden, UK

Mansion Entrance - Lee Coach Road, Witley, UK

The Ravenhurst Manor - Loseley Park, Guildford, UK

Room With Paintings - Dorney Court, Windsor, UK

General Store - Pheasant's Hill Frieth, Hambleden, UK

Technical specifications 
Runtime: 1 hr 42 min (102 min)

Sound Mix: Dolby

Color: Technicolor

Aspect Ratio: 1.85:1

Laboratory: Rank Film Laboratories, Denham, UK

Negative Format: 35 mm

Cinematographic Process: Spherical

Printed Film Format: 16 mm, 35 mm

Release

Box office
The Legacy premiered in the United Kingdom on 29 September 1978, before having its U.S. premiere approximately one year later, opening in New York City on 28 September 1979. It subsequently premiered in Los Angeles on 16 November 1979. The US theatrical cut has a 2 minute shorter runtime and some alternative shots.

Home media
Universal Studios released The Legacy on DVD in North America on 7 September 2004.

Scream Factory released The Legacy on Blu-ray in North America on 15 September 2015.

British distributor Powerhouse Films released a new region-free limited edition Blu-ray through their Indicator series on 29 July 2019, which included the following bonus features:

 An Extended Legacy (2019, 11 mins): an analysis of the differences between the US and UK cuts
 Audio commentary with Kevin Lyon
 An Editing Legacy (2015, 14 mins): editor and second unit director Anne V Coates recalls her work on the film
 The Make-up Effects of The Legacy (2015, 11 mins): Robin Grantham on his make-up creations for the film
 Ashes and Crashes (2019, 4 mins): interview with second unit director Joe Marks, who shares his memories of working with the film’s cast and crew
 Between the Anvil and the Hammer (1973, 27 mins): Richard Marquand’s Central Office of Information short about the Liverpool police force
 Theatrical trailer
 Image gallery
 Collector’s booklet with a new essay by Julian Upton, an archival location report, Jimmy Sangster on The Legacy, extracts from the novelization, an overview of critical responses, an introduction to Between the Anvil and the Hammer, and film credits

Soundtrack 
The original music score was composed by Michael J. Lewis. The opening-credits theme song ("Another Side of Me") is performed by Kiki Dee.

Reception 
Audience reception was mixed, but most critics found the good aspects of the film overshadowed by its shortcomings.

The New York Times described The Legacy as a 'depressing' horror film, stating “in place of invention it uses contrivance, and in place of imagination it uses shock”. Variety stated "The film, directed with no tension or suspenseful pacing...takes an eternity to get down to business". People magazine negatively compared it to The Exorcist.

Dread Central wrote a mixed review for The Legacy, stating, "It’s hard to hate a movie that spends most of its time being so off-the-wall ridiculous. The Legacy doesn’t remotely work in the way it was intended to but, despite a few dull stretches, there’s plenty of nonsense on display to enjoy." HorrorNews.net's review was also mixed, and praised Daltrey's acting and the film's settings, while criticizing the film's upbeat soundtrack and plot holes.

Two years after its release, Sam Elliott gave an interview to Jerry Buck of the Associated Press in which he said, "I wouldn't rush out to see it. It's about fifteen years behind its time." On Rotten Tomatoes, the film holds a rating of 24% from 17 reviews.

References in other media 
The Legacy movie poster was seen in Fade To Black (1980), and the video case is shown in the documentary Ban the Sadist Videos! (2005). Video clips of The Legacy were featured in season 3, episode 11 of the show Sneak Previews (1979).

Adaptations into other mediums 
John Coyne was asked to write a novelization in six weeks to promote the movie. Reviews unanimously prefer the novelization over the movie, and the book was briefly a best-seller.

Trivia 
The Legacy is perhaps best remembered now for being the film where Hollywood couple Katharine Ross (Margaret Walsh) and Sam Elliott (Pete Danner) first met. During production, he was single, while she was married to the Italian-American actor Gaetano Lisi. Ross’s marriage ended the following year and, eventually, the pair announced their romance to the public. They married in 1984. In fact, this wasn't the first film on which they had worked, as they both starred in Butch Cassidy and the Sundance Kid several years previously. Ross was the leading lady in that film and a bona fide movie star while Elliott was merely what he called a "glorified extra", which left him without the courage to approach her.

References

Sources

External links 
 
 
 

1978 films
1978 directorial debut films
1978 horror films
1970s supernatural films
American haunted house films
American supernatural horror films
British supernatural horror films
Films directed by Richard Marquand
Films set in country houses
Films shot in Berkshire
Films shot in Buckinghamshire
Films shot in London
Films shot in Oxfordshire
Films shot in Surrey
Films shot in England
Universal Pictures films
Films with screenplays by Jimmy Sangster
1970s English-language films
1970s American films
1970s British films